The 1828 United States presidential election in New York took place between October 31 and December 2, 1828, as part of the 1828 United States presidential election. Voters chose 36 representatives, or electors to the Electoral College, who voted for President and Vice President. For this election, New York used the Congressional District Method of choosing electors, with 34 of its electors being chosen by the winner in each of the state's congressional districts, and the remaining two being chosen by the first 34 electors. Jackson won 18 congressional districts while Adams won 16. This election marks the first time New York did not chose its electoral votes through its State Legislature.

Adams support in New York aligned with the Anti-Masonic Party and Thurlow Weed, his campaign manager in the state, was sympathetic to the anti-masonic movement.

New York voted for the Democratic candidate, Andrew Jackson, over the National Republican candidate, John Quincy Adams. Jackson won New York by a margin of 2.9%.

Results

See also
 United States presidential elections in New York

References

Works cited
 

New York
1828
1828 New York (state) elections